Carlo Napolitano is an Italian rugby league coach and former player. He is the former head coach of Italy, having taken charge of the national side in 2004, and being succeeded by Trent Barrett in 2014.

Career
He coached Italy during the 2013 Rugby League World Cup qualifying tournament, and reprised his role at the 2013 Rugby League World Cup

Following this Carlo moved to Australia where he made his debut for the Port Kembla Pumas where he quickly became a club legend by being the first player to take the field in all 4 divisions within a single season.

Awards and nominations

Other ventures
Carlo Napolitano is now the Chief Executive Officer of Armada Advisory and Castle Compensation Partners. He is also committee member of Australian Alopecia Areata Foundation (AAAF), an Australian national body dedicated to improving lives of people living with Alopecia Areata and their families.

External links
 Carlo Napolitano – Rugby League Project
 Carlo Napolitano - CEO – Armada Advisory
 Carlo Napolitano - CEO – Castle Compensation Partners

References

Living people
Italian sports coaches
Italy national rugby league team coaches
Italy national rugby league team players
Rugby league players from Salford
Rugby league props
Salford Red Devils players
Swinton Lions players
Year of birth missing (living people)